Mahogany (1 October 1990 – 20 November 2021) (Last Tycoon from Alshandegha) was an Australian thoroughbred who raced in the mid-1990s. He was aimed at the three-year-old staying events, where he won the Victoria Derby and the Australian Derby. As an older horse he usually was restricted to sprint races.

The notable exception was the 1995 W.S. Cox Plate where he ran a photo-finish second to Octagonal.

Mahogany won 8 Group One events and won A$3,670,977. He was owned by businessmen Kerry Packer and Lloyd Williams and trained by Lee Freedman.

Mahogany was awarded Australian Horse of the Year for the 1993-1994 racing season.

The Mahogany Room at Crown Casino was named after him.

See also
List of millionaire racehorses in Australia

References
 Mahogany's pedigree and partial racing stats

1990 racehorse births
2021 racehorse deaths
Victoria Derby winners
Thoroughbred family 20-a
Racehorses bred in Australia
Racehorses trained in Australia
Australian Champion Racehorse of the Year